The John Paul Jones Memorial is a monument in West Potomac Park in Washington, D.C.  The memorial honors John Paul Jones, the United States' first naval war hero, father of the United States Navy, the only naval officer to receive a Congressional Gold Medal during the American Revolutionary War, and whose famous quote "I have not yet begun to fight!" was uttered during the Battle of Flamborough Head.

History
Dedicated on April 17, 1912, the John Paul Jones Memorial was the first monument raised in Potomac Park.  The memorial is located near the National Mall at the terminus of 17th Street Southwest near Independence Avenue on the northern bank of the Tidal Basin. A nearby marker contains a biographical sketch of John Paul Jones, and describes the memorial's history and features.

The memorial consists of a 10-foot (3 m) bronze statue that was sculpted by Charles H. Niehaus and a 15-foot (4.6 m) marble pylon. On each side of the monument, water flows out of ducts into a small pool. On the reverse side of the monument is a bas-relief of Jones raising the United States flag on his ship, the Bonhomme Richard. The event is believed to be the first time the United States flag was flown on an American warship.

The statue is listed on the National Register of Historic Places as part of the American Revolution Statuary group in Washington, D.C.

See also
 Outdoor sculpture in Washington, D.C.
 United States Navy Memorial

References

External links
 

1912 sculptures
Bronze sculptures in Washington, D.C.
Historic district contributing properties in Washington, D.C.
American Revolution Statuary
National Mall and Memorial Parks
Southwest (Washington, D.C.)
Naval monuments and memorials